Paul Adrian Lamford (born 30 August 1953 in Carmarthen) is a Welsh gaming and gambling expert, author, publisher and company director. He is a three-time Welsh chess champion, 1993 and 2001 British backgammon champion, and a Grandmaster at bridge and a poker player. During the 1990s he was editor of Games & Puzzles magazine and has been editor of Chess magazine and Bridge magazine. He appeared several times on Radio 4's Puzzle Panel.

Chess
Lamford shared the Welsh Chess Championship in 1983 and 1988, and won it outright in 1989. He represented Wales at four chess olympiads (1982, 1984, 1986 and 1988), scoring 50% overall. His peak FIDE rating was 2315 in the January 1979 list. He was awarded the title of International Arbiter in 1986. At correspondence chess, he was awarded the ICCF International Master title in 1990. Lamford is also known for his chess compositions.

Bibliography

References

External links
 
 

1953 births
Living people
Welsh chess players
Backgammon players
Welsh contract bridge players
British Scrabble players
Welsh poker players
British non-fiction writers
Chess arbiters